CJSC "Air Company ALROSA" (ZAO «Aviakompanija ALROSA»; , Alrosa aviaxampannya), formerly Alrosa Mirny Air Enterprise (Alrosa Air Company Limited) is an airline from Mirny, Russia. Its bases are at Mirny Airport and Polyarny Airport, with a focus city at Lensk Airport. The airline operates scheduled and chartered domestic flights.

History
Alrosa Mirny Air Enterprise was founded by the Russian mining company ALROSA (Almazy Rossii Sakha). A sister company Alrosa Avia, which was established in 1992 and operated passenger charter services in Russia and the CIS out of Moscow Vnukovo Airport. The company's flight certificate was annulled on 21 November 2008. On 29 September 2018, RA-85684, the aircraft involved in Alrosa Flight 514 completed its last flight from Mirny to Novosibirsk. The aircraft was installed as a monument at the Tolmachevo Museum of Aviation.

On 29 October 2020, ALROSA airline operated the last civil Tu-154 flight in Russia. The Tu-154, tail number RA-85757, flew from Mirny to Novosibirsk carrying 140 passengers.

Destinations
 
 
Alrosa Mirny Air Enterprise serves the following destinations within Russia:
Russia
Irkutsk – Irkutsk Airport
Krasnodar – Krasnodar International Airport
Krasnoyarsk – Yemelyanovo Airport
Lensk – Lensk Airport focus city
Mirny – Mirny Airport base
Moscow Domodedovo Airport
Novosibirsk – Tolmachevo Airport
Pulkovo International Airport
Tomsk - Bogashevo Airport
Udachny – Polyarny Airport base
Yakutsk – Yakutsk Airport
Yekaterinburg – Koltsovo Airport

Russia/Ukraine (disputed territory of Crimea)
Simferopol International Airport

Fleet
As of July 2022, the ALROSA fleet - excluding helicopters - includes the following aircraft:

Accidents and Incidents

References

External links

Airlines of Russia
Airlines established in 2000
Companies based in Sakha Republic
Russian companies established in 1992
Russian companies established in 2000